Oriental Theological Seminary (OTS) is a Christian religious educational institution situated in Bade, Chümoukedima District, Nagaland. It was founded in 1991 by Nagaland Baptist Church Council (NBCC). Wati Aier was the first Principal of the institution. In September 2017, Dr. Joshua Lorin took the reins as the Principal from Aier. Courses offered by the institution are Master of Divinity and Master of Theology.

Foundation 
At its inception, the NBCC gave Dr. Wati Aier the responsibility to start and build the institution from scratch. Bade village donated the land for the seminary. Aier along with his wife, Alongla Aier, began with clearing the forested area. Thereafter, they began with setting thatched roof classrooms. Wati Aier cooked for the students, joined them for weekly football matches, and played the trumpet in the seminary choir. He also wrote and composed several songs for the OTS choir.

Covid Crisis 
At the start of the pandemic, three men and seven women from Myanmar studying at OTS were stranded after the lockdown regulations came into force. They were theology students. They were sent home via Moreh after spending few days at the Electricity Guest House in quarantine.

Courses

MA in Clinical Counselling 
On December 1, 2019, OTS launched its MA in Clinical Counselling programme. It is an interdisciplinary course engaging psychology, theology, and Christian practices. The head of department for counselling, Ellen Konyak Jamir envisioned the programme to nurture Christian leaders to serve people through the practice of clinical counselling.

References

Bible colleges
Christian seminaries and theological colleges in India
Universities and colleges in Nagaland
Chümoukedima
Educational institutions established in 1991
1991 establishments in Nagaland